Mount Jord is a peak,  high, located northwest of Hetha Peak on the ridge between Hart Glacier and Goodspeed Glacier, in the Asgard Range of Victoria Land, Antarctica. In association with names from Norse mythology grouped in this range, it was named by the New Zealand Geographic Board in 1998 after Jörð, a mythological Norse earth goddess.

References

Mountains of the Asgard Range
Scott Coast